Zeynalu may refer to:
 Zeynalu, Shahin Dezh
 Zeynalu, Urmia